The 2006/2007 season of the Eerste Divisie began on August 11, 2006 and ended in May 2007.

Promoted teams
The following teams were promoted to the Eredivisie at the end of the season:
De Graafschap (champion)
VVV-Venlo (playoffs)

New team
This team was relegated out of the Eredivisie at the start of the season:
RBC Roosendaal (18th position)

League standings

Playoffs
Round 1

Round 2 (best of 3)

Round 3 (best of 3)

VVV Venlo and Excelsior will play in the 2007–08 Eredivisie

Match table

Topscorers
Final standings

See also
 2006–07 Eredivisie
 2006–07 KNVB Cup

External links
JupilerLeague.nl - Official website Eerste Divisie 

Eerste Divisie seasons
2006–07 in Dutch football
Neth